Nicholas Adams, (alias Bodrugan) (fl. 1521 – c. 1584), of the Middle Temple, London and Townstal (alias Tunstall), near Dartmouth in Devon, was an English Member of Parliament.

Career
He was the 1st son of John Adams of Venn, Devon and Catherine, daughter of John Stebbing alias Bodrugan of Dartmouth. He was educated in Middle Temple, London. He held the office of Counsel to Dartmouth by 1542-51 or later.
Adams was a Member of Parliament for West Looe in 1547, and Dartmouth in March 1553, October 1553, April 1554 and November 1554.

Adams had his first experience of Parliament in 1547, when he sat for Cornwall. He did not show any significant activity during his first membership in Parliament. But in his second session he was marked with the publication of the treatise An Epitome of the title that the kynges Maiestie of Englande hath to the souereigntie of Scotlande, supporting the union of the two kingdoms. During his second membership "his own position was reinforced by his connection with the two knights for Devon, his brother-in-law John Fulford and Sir Peter Carew".

Personal life
Nicholas Adams was married twice, the first wife was Cecily, daughter of Sir John Fulford of Fulford, Devon. He married his second wife Mary by 21 January 1547.

References

Year of birth missing
1584 deaths
16th-century births
Members of the Parliament of England for Dartmouth
Members of the Parliament of England for West Looe
English MPs 1547–1552
English MPs 1553 (Edward VI)
English MPs 1553 (Mary I)
English MPs 1554
English MPs 1554–1555
Bodrugan family